VideoBook is a brand of online, interactive educational videos marketed by Studio 21.

History
The name "VideoBook" was first registered and used in the United Kingdom (UK) in 1982 by Barry R. Pyatt, the owner of Yorkshire film producers "Studio 21." VideoBook was the marque, trading title and style for local-interest and sell-through video films. The name VideoBook was in commercial use by Studio 21 in the UK and Spain until 2003. In 2004, Pyatt opened AngelFilms in Spain, which took over the VideoBook marque. In 2005, AngelFilms-UK was established, and in 2008, VideoBook products were re-launched in the UK.

Marque
Video Books are identified and registered with the ISBN agencies. The trademark style is as one word, with uppercase V and uppercase B, in a modified Bookman typeface, and is Pyatt's exclusive property.

The name "videobook" (without the two uppercase characters) has become a standard term for a form of online training that delivers downloadable training videos. Most video books are single website entities that focus on teaching a particular topic.

Video books are similar in content and structure to a "regular" book. The videos are typically recorded by a trained instructor and offered to the viewer on a subscription model. The user visits the video book (the website containing the training videos), purchases a subscription and can then download the videos.

Video Books are different from many Computer-based training (CBT) models in that they are typically in a shareable and portable format. They also differ in content delivery. Video Books are not to be confused with many Video Books or Video Booklets that companies like PrintAVizion, manufacturer for other businesses to promote services and products to prospecting clients.  Information source 

In contrast to printed books and audio books which rely solely on text and audio, respectively, the basic component of a videobook is video. The video book can have on-screen text along with pictures and video clips. The text may be animated along with related audio background commentary.

The student can watch videos in any order. Once downloaded, no Internet connection is necessary. The videos use non-proprietary formats. The target market is usually an individual instead of an organization. Videobook materials may involve presentation software such as PowerPoint, screen-capture software such as Camtasia and text-to-speech software, such as TextAloudMP3.

Paid Videobook (online, offline) - videobook online(offline) using the private information in the form of thoughts of a person registered on the Internet project has temporal properties: time, date, month, year of writing. Copyrights are registered online on authoritative sources confirmed . Payment for the information contained in the paid videobook takes place in credit, after reading it.
Information source

See also 
 Computer-based training
 E-learning
 Web-based training
 PLR Reseller Books

Alternative education
Educational technology